Luisella Bisello (born 16 March 1968) is an Italian diver. She competed in two events at the 1992 Summer Olympics.

References

1968 births
Living people
Italian female divers
Olympic divers of Italy
Divers at the 1992 Summer Olympics
Sportspeople from Verona